The William and Jane Phinney House is a historic house at 555 Phinney's Lane in the Centerville area of Barnstable, Massachusetts.  Built c. 1659 later updated to a 3/4 cape in 1715, it is the oldest surviving house in the village, and has an early surviving example of a bowed roof, a distinctive regional variation on the Cape style house. The house was listed on the National Register of Historic Places in 1987.

Description and history
The William and Jane Phinney House stands in the northern part of the village of Centerville, on the north side of Phinney's Lane at its junction with Richard's Lane.  It is a -story wood-frame structure, with a bowed gable roof, central chimney, and clapboarded exterior.  It has a symmetrical five-bay facade, with a center entrance that has a four-light transom window above.  Structural timbers are exposed in its interior, which also retains other original 18th-century features.  The only major alterations have been the addition of electricity and plumbing.

By local tradition, the oldest portion of this building is a "half Cape" (three bays wide) built about 1730.  It was probably built by William Phinney, its first owner, in a part of Centerville that was one of the earliest areas to be settled by European colonists.  It is significant as an early example of a bowed roof, a notable regional variant often associated with carpenters experienced in the shipbuilding trade.

See also
National Register of Historic Places listings in Barnstable County, Massachusetts

References

Houses in Barnstable, Massachusetts
National Register of Historic Places in Barnstable, Massachusetts
Houses on the National Register of Historic Places in Barnstable County, Massachusetts
Houses completed in 1730